Layia fremontii is a species of flowering plant in the family Asteraceae known by the common name Frémont's tidytips. Both its common name, and its specific epithet are derived from John C. Frémont.

It is endemic to California, where it grows in the northern Coast Ranges, the Central Valley, and the Sierra Nevada foothills.

Description
Layia fremontii is an annual herb growing a nonglandular erect stem to a maximum height approaching 40 centimeters. The linear or lance-shaped leaves are somewhat fleshy, with the lower ones multilobed and approaching 7 centimeters in maximum length.

The flower head has a base of phyllaries with fuzzy margins and hairy, bumpy surfaces. Like many other species of tidytips, the ray florets are bright yellow tipped neatly with white. The disc florets are yellow with purple anthers. The fruit is a hairy achene with a pappus of many white scales.

References

External links
Jepson Manual Treatment
USDA Plants Profile
Photo gallery

fremontii
Endemic flora of California
Flora of the Sierra Nevada (United States)
Natural history of the California chaparral and woodlands
Natural history of the California Coast Ranges
Natural history of the Central Valley (California)
Taxa named by Asa Gray
Taxa named by John Torrey
Flora without expected TNC conservation status